is a 1994 Japanese animated feature film based on the SNK video game series Fatal Fury originally released in Japan on July 16, 1994. Discotek Media released a Blu-ray version on July 25, 2017. It was directed by character designer Masami Ōbari and follows the same continuity as the preceding two TV specials, Fatal Fury: Legend of the Hungry Wolf and Fatal Fury 2: The New Battle but this movie shifts from arcade canon to an all-new storyline centering on original characters, although many of the characters from the first two Fatal Fury specials make extensive cameo appearances through the film.

The original ending theme in Japanese is "Yoake no Legend" ("Dawn of a Legend") by Kazukiyo Nishikiori of Shonentai. For the North American film release, the song was given the title "Oh Angel", and re-recorded with English lyrics by Canadian singer Warren Stanyer.

Plot 
While exploring a cave in Egypt, Cheng Sinzan discovers a leg armor plate said to be one of six pieces of the Armor of Mars, only to be defeated by Laocorn Gaudeamus and his three henchmen – Panni (who has pink hair and wears red armor), Hauer (who has white hair and wears white armor, as well as the golden mask on his face), and Jamin – before Laocorn attaches the part to his body and destroys the cave. In Japan, Joe Higashi defeats Muay-Thai champion Hwa Jai and reunites with his friends Terry and Andy Bogard, as well as Mai Shiranui. While being chased by a masked assailant, Sulia Gaudeamus - Laocorn's younger twin sister - befriends Terry. After Big Bear is knocked unconscious by the assailant, Kim Kaphwan defeats him, exposing the assailant as Cheng. Sulia reveals that she has searched for Terry since his battle with Wolfgang Krauser. Sulia, Terry, Andy, Mai, and Joe travel to Rhodes, where Sulia reveals that she is a descendant of Gaudeamus, a powerful warrior whose armor drew fear among Alexander the Great. Alexander's generals killed Gaudeamus, but the armor gained life after his death and reincarnated himself as Mars before destroying a city; it was eventually defeated by four warriors. To prevent Mars from destroying cities again, the armor was broken up and hidden in different locations. On the island, the five discover a series of cave paintings that indicate martial arts moves such as Tung Fu Rue's Hurricane Punch and Krauser's Blitz Ball were influenced by Gaudeamus. Sulia reveals that she possesses healing powers due to her heritage and shares a mental bond with Laocorn. After Sulia discovers the locations of two of the three remaining armor pieces, the group divides into two subgroups in an attempt to find them.

While searching for the breastplate in Turkey, Terry, Joe, and Sulia discover an ancient chamber, which was unearthed in the police station's destruction, and realize that the breastplate is in Germany's Stroheim Castle, Krauser's former home. Joe is sent to Baghdad to rendezvous with Andy and Mai. In Iraq, Andy and Mai find out that the site of the leg armor was raided when the Mongolians sacked Baghdad and brought their loot back to China. Realizing that Tung Fu Rue knew the location of the armor piece before he died, their next lead would be Tung's old friend Jubei Yamada. Attempting to find the breastplate, Terry and Sulia encounter Laocorn and Jamin and they escape, but Terry is seriously injured in the process. In Japan, Andy and Mai go to Duck King's nightclub, where they have arranged to meet with Jubei. As Jubei gives Andy the location of the leg armor, Andy encounters Geese Howard's staff-wielding henchman Billy Kane, but are interrupted by Hauer. After unsuccessfully trying to seduce Mai, Hauer accidentally destroys the nightclub.

After healing Terry using part of her life force, Sulia tells him that her and Laocorn's father was leading an expedition to find the Armor of Mars after discovering the first piece - the right gauntlet. However, a business partner shot the twins' father and wounded Laocorn, but Laocorn killed the murderer with the gauntlet. Since then, Laocorn developed an insatiable desire to complete the armor. Hearing the story, Terry vows to fight to protect Sulia from any pain or suffering. In China, Andy retrieves the leg armor when he and Mai are defeated by Hauer, who almost kisses Mai, causing Andy to grow angry, and steals the piece. Meanwhile, Panni defeats Krauser's former henchman Laurence Blood and acquires the breastplate. The five regroup in Rhodes, where Sulia tells them that Laocorn has not found the crown - the sixth armor piece. They discover a secret chamber behind the cave paintings and use Sulia's pendant to reveal the Dead Sea in Israel as the location of the final piece.

In Jerusalem, as Andy practices his techniques, Terry and Joe pass out while Mai and Sulia are cornered by Panni, Hauer, and Jamin. Sulia agrees to go with her older twin brother if he promises not to harm her friends. Sulia and Jamin disappear, while Hauer and Panni are easily defeated by Andy and Mai, who share a kiss after Panni and Hauer's defeat.

The heroes head for the Dead Sea, where Laocorn uses his powers to raise an ancient temple. After being defeated by Terry's Burning Knuckle technique at the temple's entrance, Jamin tells him that he can save Laocorn and Sulia due to their bonds.

Laocorn finds the armor's crown, mounted on a statue of Mars, and crowns himself - causing the armor to encase him in vermeil and augment his powers and abilities. Andy, Joe, and Mai join in the fight, but are overpowered by Laocorn's newly acquired god-like powers. When Laocorn is about to finish the heroes, however, Sulia stabs her arm to injure Laocorn. As his abilities have become more powerful, so has his mental bond with his sister. Sulia stabs herself in the chest, causing more pain to Laocorn. As she dies, Sulia tells Terry to strike Laocorn's breastplate. Terry defeats Laocorn and reduces his armor into four coins, which assimilate into the statue of Mars, reviving it after the heroes mourn over Sulia's death, with Terry kissing Sulia. Realizing that this armor was using him to revive Mars, Laocorn jumps in front of Andy who was shielding Mai, Laocorn dies from Mars' attack by sacrificing himself. Terry combines it with his skills to attack Mars and eventually defeats him with the Buster Wolf attack. After escaping the temple with Mai, Andy, and Joe, Terry throws his cap into the air as the heroes leave.

Voice cast

Cameo appearances 
 Reiko Chiba, a singer and voice actress who posed as Nakoruru in SNK's Samurai Shodown advertising campaign has two speaking roles in the original Japanese version of the film. She is best known for playing Mei in the Japanese Super Sentai series, Kyōryū Sentai Zyuranger.
 The first is right after Joe's bout with Hwa Jai in which she congratulates him. He instantly recognizes her as "THAT Reiko Chiba" (in the English version of the same scene, Reiko's character is not named and Joe simply asks if it is "really her").
 The second is during a scene in Duck King's "King of Dancing" nightclub, when she, dressed as her character Nakoruru, switches places with Mai, who has disappeared in order to get ready for a surprise stage performance. This can be considered somewhat of a double in-joke, as Reiko once performed an image song for Mai on the arranged soundtrack to Fatal Fury Special.

Reception 
The film received positive reviews from critics in the 1990s. In 1997, Max Autohead of Hyper magazine gave it a highly positive review, scoring it 10 out of 10 and calling it "without a doubt the best animated martial arts slug fest movie I have seen." In 1998, Shidoshi of GameFan magazine gave it a B+ rating and considered it the best game-based anime to date, better than adaptations of Street Fighter and Samurai Shodown.

In his review for Anime News Networks "Shelf Life" column, Bamboo Dong called Discotek Media's release of the film "one of the most enjoyable, and the easiest to consume as a standalone property". Dong praised the storyline and character designs, and would later go on to say "those who are into this kind of thing will be pleased with how it's presented, and how lovingly it's been preserved". Conversely, Raphael See of THEM Anime Reviews gave the film two out of five stars. She praised the film's artwork but criticized the storyline, saying it "wasn't enough to save this flick from my boredom".

References

External links 
 
 

1994 anime films
Anime films based on video games
Fatal Fury
Martial arts anime and manga
Shochiku films
Viz Media anime
Works based on SNK video games
Discotek Media
Films scored by Toshihiko Sahashi
Manga adapted into films